James "Paddy" Condon (died 14 March 1964) was a British SAS soldier during the Indonesia–Malaysia confrontation. While a part of D squadron under the command of Sgt. Richardson and patrolling to detect mortars that had been shelling Gurkha positions, Condon's unit encountered four enemy soldiers at dusk. Scattering for emergency rendezvous locations, the unit's signaller, was not seen again. His bergen was later located by Sgt. Richardson after three days of searching, and it was surmised that Condon, having been wounded in the thigh, either died in captivity or was shot by his captors. His body was never returned, and he became the first member of the SAS to be killed operating inside Kalimantan, in Borneo. His death created a great animosity between the Indonesians and the SAS regiment.

References

Printed sources:
 
 
 

1964 deaths
Irish soldiers in the British Army
People from County Tipperary
Special Air Service soldiers
British Parachute Regiment soldiers
British military personnel killed in action
British Army personnel of the Malayan Emergency
British Army personnel of the Indonesia–Malaysia confrontation
Year of birth missing